Jeff Berry (born 25 March 1957) is  a former Australian rules footballer who played with Richmond and Footscray in the Victorian Football League (VFL).

Notes

External links 		
		
		
		
		
		
		
Living people		
1957 births		
		
Australian rules footballers from Victoria (Australia)		
Richmond Football Club players		
Western Bulldogs players